This is a list of professional wrestling managers and valets.

List

Pioneer-era (1900s–1940s)
This section lists notable professional wrestling managers, especially those of the "Farmer" Burns-Frank Gotch and "Gold Dust Trio"-eras, active prior to the formation of the National Wrestling Alliance (NWA) in 1948.

Territory-era (1940s–1980s)
This section lists notable professional wrestling managers during the "Golden Age of Professional Wrestling" following the creation of the National Wrestling Alliance (NWA) in 1948.

Modern-era (1990s-present)
This section lists notable professional wrestling managers from the collapse of the National Wrestling Alliance territory system in 1992 up to the 21st century.

See also
List of professional wrestling promoters
List of professional wrestling rosters

Footnotes
 – Entries without a birth name indicates that the individual did not perform under a ring name.
 – This includes only the individual's time as a manager as opposed to other activities in the wrestling industry.

References
General
Hornbaker, Tim. National Wrestling Alliance: The Untold Story of the Monopoly that Strangled Pro Wrestling. Toronto: ECW Press, 2007. 

Specific

External links

managers